Georgios Petropoulos (23 May 1872 – 1937) was a Greek fencer and shooter. He competed at the 1906 and 1912 Summer Olympics.

References

External links
 

1872 births
1937 deaths
Greek male fencers
Greek male sport shooters
Olympic fencers of Greece
Olympic shooters of Greece
Fencers at the 1906 Intercalated Games
Fencers at the 1912 Summer Olympics
Shooters at the 1906 Intercalated Games
Shooters at the 1912 Summer Olympics
Sportspeople from Western Greece
20th-century Greek people